Gene Profit is a former professional American football player who played defensive back for three seasons for the New England Patriots

References

1964 births
American football cornerbacks
Yale Bulldogs football players
New England Patriots players
Living people